Katherine Drewry Emery (October 11, 1906 – February 7, 1980) was an American stage and film actress.

Early years
Emery was born in Birmingham, Alabama. She graduated from Sweet Briar College in 1928 and then went home to Montclair, New Jersey, to act in semi-professional plays and direct plays for children.

Career 

Emery debuted professionally with the University Players in West Falmouth, Massachusetts, in 1932.

Her movie roles include Eyes in the Night (1942), Isle of the Dead (1945), The Locket (1946), The Walls Came Tumbling Down (1946), The Private Affairs of Bel Ami (1947), Arch of Triumph (1948), Chicken Every Sunday (1949), Strange Bargain (1949), Payment on Demand (1951), Hiawatha (1952), and Untamed Frontier (1952). Her final role was in The Maze (1953).

She is also known for her stage roles, including creating the role of Karen Wright in the original 1934 Broadway production of The Children's Hour. Other Broadway productions include The Cherry Orchard, Proof Thro' the Night, The Three Sisters, Everywhere I Roam, Roosty, As You Like It, Strangers at Home, and Carry Nation.

Personal life 
Emery was married to literature professor Paul Conant Eaton. She is the mother of television producer and film producer Rebecca Eaton and James E. C. Eaton. She died on February 7, 1980, at a medical center in Portland, Maine from lung disease at aged 73.

Filmography

References

External links 

 
 Katherine Emery on the Internet Broadway Database

1906 births
1980 deaths
Actresses from Birmingham, Alabama
20th-century American women
20th-century American people
Sweet Briar College alumni